The 2016 Alabama Crimson Tide softball team is an American softball team, representing the University of Alabama for the 2016 NCAA softball season. The Crimson Tide play their home games at Rhoads Stadium. After losing in the 2015 Women's College World Series, the 2016 team looks to make the postseason for the 18th straight year, and the Women's College World Series for eleventh time. This season represents the 20th season of softball in the school's history.

Personnel

Roster

2016 Alabama Crimson Tide Softball Roster

Coaching staff

Schedule 

|-
!colspan=9| UCF Classic

|-
!colspan=9|

|-
!colspan=9|Panther Invitational

|-
!colspan=9|

|-
!colspan=9|Easton Bama Bash

|-
!colspan=9|

|-
!colspan=9|Easton Crimson Classic

|-
!colspan=9|

|-
!colspan=9|Easton Tournament

|-
!colspan=9|

|-
!colspan=9|SEC softball tournament

|-
!colspan=9|NCAA Tuscaloosa Regional

|-
!colspan=9|NCAA Tuscaloosa Super Regional

|-
!colspan=9|NCAA Women's College World Series

Honors and awards
 Haylie McCleney & Alexis Osorio were selected to the Preaseson All-SEC Team.
 Alexis Osorio was selected as the SEC Pitcher of the Week, February 29.
 Sydney Littlejohn was selected as the SEC Pitcher of the Week, April 4.
 Reagan Dykes was selected as the SEC Freshman of the Week, April 4.
 Sydney Littlejohn was selected as the Louisville Slugger/NFCA National Pitcher of the Week, April 5.
 Sydney Littlejohn was selected as the ESPNW Player of the Week, April 6.

Ranking movement

See also
 2016 Alabama Crimson Tide baseball team

References

Alabama
Alabama Crimson Tide softball seasons
Alabama Crimson Tide softball season
Alabama
Women's College World Series seasons